Carolyn Walker (born ) is an American former politician. She served in the Arizona Senate from 1982 to 1991, and as Senate Majority Whip. She was indicted in the AzScam sting operation in 1991, and consequently expelled from the Senate.

References

Arizona Democrats
1940s births
Living people